Dave Schildkraut (January 7, 1925 – January 1, 1998) was an American jazz alto saxophonist.

Biography 
Schildkraut first played professionally with Louis Prima in 1941. Following this he played with Buddy Rich (1946), Anita O'Day (1947), Stan Kenton (1953–54), Pete Rugolo (1954), Oscar Pettiford (1954), Miles Davis ("Solar" on: Walkin', Prestige, 1954), George Handy (1955), Tony Aless (1955), Ralph Burns, Tito Puente, Johnny Richards, and Kenton again in 1959. From the 1960s, he played freelance in New York City, where he appeared regularly with Eddie Bert at the West End Cafe. Later in his life he went into semi-retirement.

He recorded only one album as a leader, in 1979. However, the album was released only in 2000 by Endgame Records as Last Date. By this time, Schildkraut's playing style was described as having adjusted from youthful mimicry of Parker to showing influence from the likes of John Coltrane, Warne Marsh and Lee Konitz.

Style 
Schildkraut's playing was fluid and brilliant in pure bebop style and was very similar to Charlie Parker's alto saxophone style: so much so that, bassist Charles Mingus misidentified him as the iconic Charlie Parker during a "blindfold test" with jazz writer Leonard Feather that was published in Down Beat.

Discography

As leader
 Last Date (Endgame, 2000)

As sideman
 Tony Aless, Long Island Suite (Royal Roost, 1955)
 Buddy Arnold, Wailing (ABC-Paramount, 1956)
 Tony Bennett, Cloud 7 (CBS/Sony, 1975)
 Eddie Bert, Let's Dig Bert (Eddie That Is) (Trans-World, 1955)
 Ralph Burns, Jazz Studio 5 (Decca, 1956)
 Miles Davis, Walkin' (Prestige, 1957)
 George Handy, Handyland U.S.A. ("X", 1954)
 George Handy, By George! (Handy, of Course) ("X", 1956)
 Stan Kenton, Kenton Showcase (Capitol, 1954)
 Stan Kenton, The Kenton Era (Capitol, 1955)
 Sam Most, Plays Bird, Bud, Monk and Miles (Bethlehem, 1957)
 Oscar Pettiford, Basically Duke (Bethlehem, 1954)
 Jimmy Raney, Chuck Wayne, Joe Puma, Dick Garcia, The Fourmost Guitars (ABC-Paramount, 1957)
 Johnny Richards, Walk Softly Run Wild (Coral, 1959)
 Pete Rugolo, Rugolomania (Columbia, 1955)
 Pete Rugolo, New Sounds by Pete Rugolo (Harmony, 1957)

References

1925 births
1998 deaths
American male saxophonists
Musicians from New York (state)
20th-century American saxophonists
American jazz alto saxophonists
20th-century American male musicians
American male jazz musicians